The Azerbaijan Fed Cup team represents Azerbaijan in Fed Cup tennis competition and are governed by the Azerbaijan Tennis Federation.  They have not competed since 2007.

History
Azerbaijan competed in its first Fed Cup in 2006.  Their best result was fifth place in Group III in 2006 and 2007.

Players

See also
Fed Cup
Azerbaijan Davis Cup team

External links

Billie Jean King Cup teams
Fed Cup
Fed Cup
2006 establishments in Azerbaijan
Sports clubs established in 2006